Charged multivesicular body protein may refer to:

CHMP1A
CHMP1B
CHMP2A
CHMP2B
CHMP4A
CHMP4B
CHMP4C
CHMP5
CHMP6

See also
CHMP (disambiguation)